Tony or Anthony Ward may refer to:

Tony Ward (Australian actor) (1924–2006), Australian television actor and current affairs reporter
Tony Ward (designer) (born 1970), Lebanese-Italian fashion designer
Tony Ward (footballer) (born 1970), English footballer
Tony Ward (model) (born 1963), American model, actor, fashion designer and photographer
Tony Ward (referee) (born 1941), British Association Football referee
Tony Ward (rugby union) (born 1954), Irish rugby union player and footballer
Tony Ward (umpire) (born 1959), Australian cricket umpire
Anthony Ward (born 1957), British theatre designer
Anthony Ward, British commodities trader and hedge fund manager for Armajaro

See also
Anthony Warde (1908–1975), American actor

High fashion brands